Happy Holiday is a Christmas EP by American singer-songwriter Marcella Detroit, released independently through digital retailers in November 2011.

Background 
Happy Holiday is Detroit's first solo release since her Dancing Madly Sideways album in 2001. The EP consists of two original songs - including "You Better Be Good", first released as a single in 2009 - and two covers. On 3 December 2011, Detroit premiered a low-budget music video for the EP's title track on her official YouTube channel, featuring her and a band (also played by Detroit) performing in front of an animated snowy green screen backdrop. A two-track extension to the EP, Holiday 2012, was released a year later in November 2012. Both Happy Holiday and Holiday 2012 were included in their entirety on Detroit's 2013 Holiday album, For the Holidays.

Track listing

References 

2011 EPs
2011 Christmas albums
Christmas albums by American artists
Pop Christmas albums
Marcella Detroit albums
Christmas EPs